is a 2006 Japanese comedy baseball film written and directed by Teruyoshi Uchimura.

Plot
Koichi Akiyoshi, the legendary third baseman in the former prestigious grass baseball team "Peanuts", will start to rebuild the Peanuts. They have become a weak team. Peanuts will fight against powerful teams, taking advantage of the redevelopment of the city where captain and Sagara live.

Cast
Koichi Akiyoshi – 秋吉光一 (sportswriter): Teruyoshi Uchimura
Kazuo Sagara – 相良和雄 (wine shop storekeeper): Masakazu Mimura (Summers)
Masaki Fumino – 文野正樹 (man who runs from a debt collector): Kazuki Ōtake (Summers)
Ittetsu Katsuta – 勝田一鉄 (small restaurant owner, former ace pitcher): Golgo Matsumoto (TIM)
Noboru Akaiwa – 赤岩登 (slugger of a childcare provider): Red Yoshida (TIM)
Ryoichi Miyamoto – 宮本良一 (record shop manager): Ryō Fukawa
Miyuki Kusano – 草野みゆき (daughter of director of PEANUTS, Tsutomu Kusano): Megumi Sato
Haruo Akiyama – 秋山ハルオ (the laundry's eldest son): Kazuki Iio (Zun)
Natsuo Akiyama – 秋山ナツオ (the laundry's second son)：Tadahiro Aoki
Akio Akiyama – 秋山アキオ (the laundry's third son)：Masataka Fijisige
Tsutomu Kusano – 草野務 (chairperson in business and industry, director of PEANUTS): Bengal
Mariko Sagara – 相良まりこ (wife of Kazuo Sagara): Hiroko Nakajima
Siori Sagara – 相良しおり (daughter of Kazuo Sagara)： Nana Yamauchi
Akane Akaiwa – 赤岩アカネ (wife of Noboru Akaiwa )：Kaoru Okunuki
Toscania Katsuta – 勝田トスカーニャ (wife of Ittetsu Katsuta): Adeyto (Laura Windrath)
Yuriko Miyajina – 宮島百合子 (lover of Koichi Akiyoshi): Sachiko Sakurai
Kenji Osak – 大崎健二 (president of Towa new town development): Sugemitsu Ogi
Takeshi Shibuya – 渋谷武志 (employee of Towa new town): Yūki Matsumura
Mr. Tanaka – 田中 (supervisor of the NewTowns): Kō Takasugi
Fujinoki – 藤ノ木 (NewTowns' pitcher): Manabu Hamada
Sugimoto – 杉本 ( NewTowns' catcher): Yūsuke Kamiji
Parents of Ryoichi Miyamoto – 宮本良一の両親: Real parents of Ryo Fukawa
Baron chin – あご男爵 (a job-hopping part-timer): Teppei Arita (Cream Stew)
Shūji Sonobe – 園部修二 (senior and charge editor of Akiyoshi): Masato Irie
Miki – ミキ (former wife of Masaki Fumino): Tomoko Nakajima (Othello)
Police officer – 警官: Taizō Harada (Neptune)
Sports shop visitor – スポーツショップの客: Udo Suzuki (Kyaiin)
Station employee – 駅員: Tetsurō Degawa
Bar visitor – 飲み屋の客: Naoto Takenaka

Theme song 
 No Plan performing "Kimi no naka no Shonen" (君の中の少年, A heart like a boy in you) from the album Last Plan.

See also
Uchimura Produce

External links
『PEANUTS』Official site (Japanese)
SibuyaQ-AX Official site (Japanese)

2006 films
Japanese baseball films
2000s Japanese-language films
2000s Japanese films